Second Thoughts, also released as The Crime of Peter Frame, is a 1938 British drama film directed by Albert Parker and starring Frank Fox, Evelyn Ankers, Frank Allenby and Joan Hickson.  It was made at Wembley Studios as a quota quickie by the British subsidiary of 20th Century Fox.

Synopsis
The screenplay concerns a chemist who is left unhinged following a laboratory explosion and begins to plot a murder.

Cast
 Frank Fox as Tony Gordon
 Evelyn Ankers as Molly Frame
 Frank Allenby as Peter Frame
 A. Bromley Davenport as George Gaunt
 Marjorie Fielding as Mrs Gaunt
 Joan Hickson as Ellen
 Bill Shine as Minor Role

Critical reception
TV Guide called it an "Undistinguished second feature in spite of all the spent rage."

References

Bibliography
 Chibnall, Steve. Quota Quickies: The Birth of the British 'B' Film. British Film Institute, 2007.
 Low, Rachael. Filmmaking in 1930s Britain. George Allen & Unwin, 1985.
 Wood, Linda. British Films, 1927-1939. British Film Institute, 1986.

External links

1938 films
1938 drama films
British drama films
Films directed by Albert Parker
British black-and-white films
1930s English-language films
1930s British films
Quota quickies
Films shot at Wembley Studios
20th Century Fox films